The Filmfare Award for Best Actor is an award, begun in 1954, presented annually at the Filmfare Awards to an actor via a jury. This is given by Filmfare as part of its annual Filmfare Awards for Hindi (Bollywood) films. The award was first given in 1954. The most recent winner of the award is Ranveer Singh.  As of 2020, Dilip Kumar and Shah Rukh Khan lead the list, with 8 wins each.

Superlatives

Dilip Kumar also holds the record for most consecutive wins, having won the award for three years in a row from 1956 to 1958. Six other actors have won the award in consecutive years; in chronological order, they are Rajesh Khanna (1971–72), Sanjeev Kumar (1976–77), Amitabh Bachchan (1978–79), Naseeruddin Shah (1981–82), Shah Rukh Khan (1998–99), and Ranbir Kapoor (2012–13).
Actors who have won both Best Actor and Best Supporting Actor awards include Ashok Kumar, Sanjeev Kumar, Amitabh Bachchan, Shammi Kapoor, Anil Kapoor, Anupam Kher, Sunny Deol, Jackie Shroff, Nana Patekar, Farhan Akhtar, Rishi Kapoor and Irrfan Khan.
Three actors were nominated for both these awards, Best Actor and Best Supporting Actor, for the same performance: Raaj Kumar for Kaajal (1966), Ashok Kumar for Aashirwad (1970) and Kamal Haasan for Saagar (1986). On both occasions, Ashok Kumar and Kamal Haasan won the Best Actor award and Raaj Kumar won the Best Supporting Actor award.
10 actors have won the Best Actor award in both the Popular and Critics categories; in chronological order they are; Anupam Kher, Shah Rukh Khan, Anil Kapoor, Amitabh Bachchan, Hrithik Roshan, Aamir Khan, Ranbir Kapoor, Rishi Kapoor, Shahid Kapoor, Irrfan Khan and Ranveer Singh.
Actors who won both these Best Actor awards (Popular and Critics) in the same year are Shah Rukh Khan (1994), Hrithik Roshan (2004), Amitabh Bachchan (2006) and Ranbir Kapoor (2012).
3 actors have won the Best Actor award for their debut performances: Rishi Kapoor for Bobby (1974), Anupam Kher for Saaransh (1985) and Hrithik Roshan for Kaho Naa... Pyaar Hai (2001). Other actors who got nominated in this category for their debut performances are Sunny Deol for Betaab (1984) and Darsheel Safary for Taare Zameen Par (2008).
Darsheel Safary became the youngest Best Actor nominee in the history of Filmfare at the age of 11 for Taare Zameen Par (2008). Rishi Kapoor became the youngest winner of the Best Actor award at the age of 21 for Bobby (1974).
Aamir Khan has the highest number of consecutive nominations, having been nominated for the award every year from 1989 till 1997, eventually winning in the 9th consecutive nomination for Raja Hindustani (1997); followed by Amitabh Bachchan being nominated consecutive eight times from 1976 to 1983 having total 15 nominations and winning the award twice in 1978 and 1979 for Amar Akbar Anthony and Don respectively.
Dilip Kumar achieved supremacy in the 1950s with 4 wins and continued domination in the 1960s with 3 wins. Rajesh Khanna took over in the 1970s with 3 wins. Naseeruddin Shah emerged successful in the 1980s with 3 wins. Shah Rukh Khan triumphed in the 1990s with 4 wins. Hrithik Roshan had 4 wins in the 2000s. Ranbir Kapoor led the 2010s with 3 wins to his credit.
Amitabh Bachchan and Shah Rukh Khan hold the record for the highest number of Best Actor nominations in a single year. Amitabh Bachchan has been nominated thrice in 1979 and 1983 and Shah Rukh Khan in 2005.
Dilip Kumar, Amitabh Bachchan and Shah Rukh Khan are the most awarded actors in the overall acting categories, with 8 awards each: Dilip Kumar and Shah Rukh Khan are the winners of eight Best Actor awards, and Amitabh Bachchan is the winner of five Best Actor awards and three Best Supporting Actor awards. Amitabh Bachchan is the most nominated actor in any major acting category at Filmfare, with 42 nominations overall.
Amitabh Bachchan holds a unique record of receiving nominations in this category in 6 decades (1970s, 1980s, 1990s, 2000s, 2010s and 2020s) and winning an award in 4 decades.
Hrithik Roshan, Shah Rukh Khan and Salman Khan are the only actors to be nominated twice for the same role. Hrithik Roshan achieved this feat twice in the Krrish franchise; he was nominated for his role as Krishna Mehra for Krrish in 2007 and 2014 for Krrish 3, and for his role as Rohit Mehra in 2004 for Koi... Mil Gaya and 2014 for Krrish 3 (he won in 2004). Shah Rukh Khan was nominated in 2007 and 2012 for his portrayal of the titular character in Don and Salman Khan was nominated in 2011 and 2013 for his role as Chulbul Pandey in Dabangg and Dabangg 2 respectively.
Devdas is the only character to win most Best Actor awards. Both Dilip Kumar and Shah Rukh Khan won for portraying the titular character in Devdas and Devdas, respectively in 1956 and in 2003.
Ranbir Kapoor is the only actor to win a Best Actor award for portraying a real Best Actor winner. He won in 2019 for portraying Sanjay Dutt in Sanju.
Three occasions where two actors were nominated for Best Actor for the same movie. In 1981, both Amitabh Bachchan and Shatrughan Sinha were nominated Best Actor for the movie Dostana. In 1983, both Dilip Kumar and Amitabh Bachchan were nominated for Best Actor for Shakti, with Kumar winning the award. In 2000, both Ajay Devgan and Salman Khan were nominated for the movie Hum Dil De Chuke Sanam.
Irrfan Khan is the only actor to receive the award posthumously in the year 2021 for the movie Angrezi Medium.

Multiple nominees 
 33 Nominations: Amitabh Bachchan
 26 Nominations: Shah Rukh Khan
 19 Nominations: Dilip Kumar, Aamir Khan
 14 Nominations: Rajesh Khanna, Hrithik Roshan
 11 Nominations: Sanjeev Kumar 
 10 Nominations: Salman Khan
 9 Nominations: Ranbir Kapoor
 8 Nominations: Anil Kapoor, Ajay Devgn

Multiple winners 
 8 Wins: Dilip Kumar, Shah Rukh Khan
 5 Wins: Amitabh Bachchan
 4 Wins: Hrithik Roshan
 3 Wins: Rajesh Khanna, Naseeruddin Shah, Aamir Khan, Ranbir Kapoor, Ranveer Singh
 2 Wins: Raj Kapoor, Dev Anand, Ashok Kumar, Sunil Dutt, Sanjeev Kumar, Anil Kapoor, Irrfan Khan

Winners and nominees

1950s

1960s

1970s

1980s

1990s

2000s

2010s

2020s

See also
 Cinema of India
Filmfare Best Actress Award
Filmfare Awards East
 Filmfare Awards South
Filmfare Marathi Awards

References

External links
 Filmfare Award Best Actor

Actor
Film awards for lead actor